Matthias Stich (born 11 October 1963) is a German sports shooter. He competed at the 1988 Summer Olympics and the 1992 Summer Olympics.

References

External links
 

1963 births
Living people
German male sport shooters
Olympic shooters of Germany
Olympic shooters of West Germany
Shooters at the 1988 Summer Olympics
Shooters at the 1992 Summer Olympics
Sportspeople from Oldenburg
20th-century German people